Peter H. Adolphson (born September 7, 1957) was an American businessman and politician

From Minnetonka, Minnesota, Adolphson served in the United States Navy. He received his bachelor's degree in business from Gustavus Adolphus College and his master's degree in finance from National University, San Diego. He was in business. Adolphson served in the Minnesota House of Representatives and was a Republican.

Notes

1957 births
Living people
People from Minnetonka, Minnesota
Businesspeople from Minnesota
Gustavus Adolphus College alumni
Republican Party members of the Minnesota House of Representatives